Buckeye Township is a defunct township in Shannon County, in the U.S. state of Missouri.

Buckeye Township was established in 1901, and named for the buckeye trees within its borders.

References

Townships in Missouri
Townships in Shannon County, Missouri